The Ceraphronidae are a small hymenopteran family with 14 genera and some 360 known species, though a great many species are still undescribed. It is a poorly known group as a whole, though most are believed to be parasitoids (especially of flies), and a few hyperparasitoids. Many are found in the soil, and of these, a number are wingless.

The family is distinguished from the closely related Megaspilidae by having a very small stigma in the wing, a very broad metasomal petiole, and a single median groove in the mesoscutum.

The taxon was erected by Alexander Henry Haliday in 1833.

References
Dessart, P., 1965 Contribution à l'étudendes Hyménoptères Proctotrupoidea.(VI)Les Ceraphroninae et quelques Megaspilinae(Ceraphronidae)du Musée Civique d'Histoire Naturelles de Gênes. Bulletin et Annales de la Société Royale Entomologique de Belgique:101:105-192.
Watson, L., and Dallwitz  M.J.,  2003. British insects: the families of Hymenoptera.Version: 16 July 2011

External links

Cedar Creek Images of pinned specimens.
Waspweb
Images at Bug Guide

Ceraphronoidea
Taxa named by Alexander Henry Haliday
Apocrita families